The Nyiro shrew (Crocidura macowi) is a species of mammal in the family Soricidae. It is endemic to Kenya.

Sources
 Hutterer, R., Jenkins, P. & Oguge, N. 2004.  Crocidura macowi.   2006 IUCN Red List of Threatened Species.   Downloaded on 30 July 2007.

Crocidura
Mammals of Kenya
Endemic fauna of Kenya
Mammals described in 1915
Taxonomy articles created by Polbot